"Closed for Business" is a song by English rock band Mansun. It was released as the lead song on Seven EP in 1997 and became their second top ten hit on the UK Singles Chart.

Overview
Seven EP was released in the interim between the touring of the band's début album and the recording of their second album, Six. The music on the EP reveals a transitional sound, in which the club-crossover britpop style of their earliest work is left behind for a more organic sound, one closer to progressive rock and post-punk. The EP sleeves are notable as they were adorned with two paintings by Stuart Sutcliffe.

Seven EP was released on Two CDs, and 7" Vinyl. CD Part One featured four new songs recorded during a session at Parr Street Studios. CD Part Two and the 7" featured live and acoustic versions of older material. "Everyone Must Win" was the first collaboration between the group and the Magazine front-man Howard Devoto. Magazine had been cited by Draper as a major influence particularly for their mix of synths and guitars. "K.I.Double.S.I.N.G." is the first Mansun song in which bassist Stove King and drummer Andie Rathbone receive writing credits. Draper explained in the liner notes to Kleptomania that "The World's Still Open" was originally intended as the lead track but was relegated for being "too commercial".

Track listing

Personnel

Mansun
 Dominic Chad - Guitar, Backing Vocals, Harpsichord
 Paul Draper - Vocals, Guitar, Strings Arrangement ("Closed For Business")
 Andie Rathbone - Drums
 Stove - Bass

Production
 Stephen Hussey - Strings Arrangement ("Closed For Business")
 Mark 'Spike' Stent - Mixing and Strings Recording ("Closed For Business")
 Nick Griffiths - Mixing ("K.I.Double.S.I.N.G.", "Dark Mavis (Acoustic)", "Stripper Vicar (Live)", "Egg Shaped Fred (Acoustic)")
 Mike Hunter - Mixing ("Everyone Must Win", "The World's Still Open"), Engineering (all tracks)
 Stuart Sutcliffe - Paintings (Hamburg, 1961/1962, courtesy of Pauline Sutcliffe, KDK Gallery, London W10)

Chart positions

References

1997 singles
Mansun songs
Songs written by Paul Draper (musician)
1997 songs
Parlophone singles